Hotel Marina is a 3-stars hotel in the spa town Balatonfüred near the Lake Balaton. The hotel is a part of the Danubius Hotels Group.

Beside its close location to the Lake Balaton beaches, the hotel offers view on the Tihany Abbey, a Benedictine monastery from 1055.

References

External links 
Homepage
Location on Google Maps.

Hotels in Balatonfüred
Hotels in Hungary
Lake Balaton
Hotels established in 1970
Hotel buildings completed in 1970